Czarnolas-Kolonia  is a village in the administrative district of Gmina Policzna, within Zwoleń County, Masovian Voivodeship, in east-central Poland.

The village has a population of 190.

References

Czarnolas-Kolonia